Necrodes surinamensis, the red-lined carrion beetle, is a species of carrion beetle in the family Silphidae. It is found in North America.

References

Further reading

External links

 

Silphidae
Articles created by Qbugbot
Beetles described in 1775
Taxa named by Johan Christian Fabricius